Dindaspur is a census town in Varanasi tehsil of Varanasi district in the Indian state of Uttar Pradesh. The census town &  village falls under the Dindaspur gram panchayat. Dindaspur Census town  & village is about 18 kilometres west of Varanasi railway station, 310 kilometres south-east of Lucknow and 25 kilometres north-west of Banaras Hindu University main gate.

Demography
Dindaspur  has  families with a total population  of 6352. Sex ratio of the census town is 918 and child sex ratio is 952. Uttar Pradesh state average for both ratios is 912 and 902 respectively .

Transportation
Dindaspur is connected by air (Lal Bahadur Shastri Airport), by train (Varanasi railway station). Babatpur (BTP) Railway Station and by road. Nearest operational airports is Lal Bahadur Shastri Airport and nearest operational railway station is Babatpur Railway Station (11 and 12 kilometres respectively from Dindaspur).

See also
 Varanasi tehsil
 Varanasi district
 Varanasi (Lok Sabha constituency)

Notes

  All demographic data is based on 2011 Census of India.

References 

Census towns in Varanasi district
Cities and towns in Varanasi district